Toby Louie Greatwood (born 21 October 2001) is an English cricketer. He made his List A debut on 6 August 2021, for Middlesex in the 2021 Royal London One-Day Cup. He made his Twenty20 debut on 5 June 2022, for Middlesex in the 2022 T20 Blast.

References

External links
 

2001 births
Living people
English cricketers
Middlesex cricketers
Place of birth missing (living people)